Sahlan (Saghalan) ,,, and also known as 'Savalan) is a village in Aji Chay Rural District, in the Central District of Tabriz County, East Azerbaijan Province, Iran. At the 2016 census, its population was 3,664.Water buffalos in Saghalan''

References 

Populated places in Tabriz County